Cho Jung-hyun (12 November 1969 – 10 July 2022) was a South Korean footballer who played as a forward.

Club career
Cho spent most of his club career playing for Yukong Elephants / Bucheon SK.

International career
He has played in the 1992 Summer Olympics.

Managerial career 
At the time of his death he was manager of Gyeongnam FC U-18 Jinju High School.

Honours 
Jeju United FC
 Korean League Cup: 1996

References 

 Cho Jung-hyun Interview at KFA.com
 Cho Jung-hyun Interview

External links 
 
 

1969 births
2022 deaths
South Korean footballers
Association football midfielders
Association football forwards
Jeju United FC players
Jeonnam Dragons players
Pohang Steelers players
K League 1 players
Footballers at the 1992 Summer Olympics
Olympic footballers of South Korea
Daegu University alumni
Deaths from pancreatic cancer